Trochostilifer is a genus of very small ectoparasitic sea snails, marine gastropod mollusks or micromollusks in   the Eulimidae family.

Species
Species within the genera Trochostilifer include:
 Trochostilifer domus Warén, 1980
 Trochostilifer entospinea Warén, B. L. Burch & T. A. Burch, 1984
 Trochostilifer eucidaricola Warén & Moolenbeek, 1989
 Trochostilifer hawaiiensis Warén, B. L. Burch & T. A. Burch, 1984
 Trochostilifer mortenseni Warén, 1980
 Trochostilifer phyllacanthicola Habe, 1989
 Trochostilifer striatus (Hedley, 1905)

References

 Warén A. (1980) Descriptions of new taxa of Eulimidae (Mollusca, Prosobranchia), with notes on some previously described genera. Zoologica Scripta 9: 283-306

Eulimidae